PALFINGER MARINE is an international manufacturer of innovative deck equipment and lifesaving appliances. The company is part of the Palfinger Group, a leading manufacturer of cranes and lifting equipment. Palfinger Marine's headquarter is in Salzburg and the company has 25 sales and service hubs in Europe, Asia, North- and South America, the Middle East, and Africa.

Products
 Marine Cranes
 Wind Cranes
 Offshore Cranes
 Winches
 Lifting and Handling Equipment
 Slipway and Stern Entry Systems 
 Access Equipment
 Life- and Rescue Boats
 Military and Professional Boats
 Davits
 Fenders

Expansion
In 2010, PALFINGER acquired Ned-Deck Marine, a dutch manufacturer of launch and recovery systems, and Ned-Decks subsidiary company Fast RSQ, a boat manufacturer. In 2012, PALFINGER took over Bergen Group Dreggen, a Norwegian manufacturer of offshore and marine cranes with a lifting capacity over 330 mt. All companies have been integrated and renamed to PALFINGER NED-DECK, PALFINGER DREGGEN and PALFINGER BOATS. In January 2015, PALFINGER finalized the acquisition of Norwegian Deck Machinery AS (NDM).

Branding
With March 2016, the acquired companies Ned-Deck Marine, Dreggen and Norwegian Deck Machinery (NDM) have been integrated under one umbrella brand and one corporate logo "PALFINGER MARINE".
The product portfolio now consists of marine-, offshore-, and wind cranes, boats, davits, and winches as well as handling/access equipment, and slipway systems. PALFINGER's marine business is a supplier for deck equipment and lifesaving appliances for the whole maritime industry.

Acquisitions
In May 2016, the PALFINGER Group signs acquisition 100 per cent of the shares in Herkules Harding Holding AS and thus, the globally operating Harding Group, headquartered in Seimsfoss, Norway. In June 2016, PALFINGER intends to make a takeover bid for Norwegian TTS Group ASA.

Locations

Europe

 Salzburg, Austria
 Seimsfoss, Norway
 Nesttun, Norway
 Harderwijk, Netherlands
 Schiedam, Netherlands
 Odense, Denmark
 Gosport, United Kingdom
 Dägeling, Germany
 Livorno, Italy
 Cadiz, Spain
 Saint-Petersburg, Russia

America

 New Iberia, Louisiana, USA
 Pompano Beach, Florida, USA
 Anacortes, Washington, USA
 Portsmouth, Virginia, USA
 Langley, Canada
 Rio de Janeiro, Brasil

Asia

 Singapore
 Shanghai, China
 Hong Kong, China
 Tokyo, Japan
 Dubai, UAE
 Abu Dhabi, UAE
 Doha, Qatar
 Al-Khobar, KSA

Production

 Harderwijk, The Netherlands
 Gdynia, Poland
 Maribor, Slovenia
 Hanoi, Vietnam
 Qingdao, China

References

Companies based in Salzburg
Manufacturing companies of Austria
Crane manufacturers